We Are in Love is an album by American artist Harry Connick Jr., released in 1990. The multi-platinum album features Connick on piano & vocal, Russell Malone on guitar, Shannon Powell on drums, Benjamin Jonah Wolfe on double bass, and Branford Marsalis on saxophone. Joining the quartet is Connick's Big Band. Most of the tracks include an orchestral background.

Released in 1990, it topped the jazz charts in the same year. The album gave Connick a Grammy for Best Jazz Vocal Performance, Male, and he performed the title track live on the Grammy telecast in 1991. "Recipe for Love" also became one of Connick's biggest hits, peaking at #32 in the UK Singles Chart on re-release (the original release had only peaked at #86).

The album was released the same day as his trio instrumental album Lofty's Roach Souffle, and his home video debut entitled Singin' & Swingin'.

Track listing

 
Recorded at Evergreen Radford Studio, North Hollywood, California on March 7–9 & 12–15, 1990 and RCA Studio B, New York, New York on April 19 & 23 and May 1, 1990.

Musicians
Harry Connick Jr. – Piano, vocals
Branford Marsalis – Tenor Sax, Soprano Sax
Russell Malone – Guitar
Benjamin Jonah Wolfe – Bass
Shannon Powell – drums

Cheers episode
Connick guest starred as Russell Boyd, in the season 10 episode of Cheers, "A Diminished Rebecca with a Suspended Cliff". Smitten by Rebecca (Kirstie Alley), Russell begins composing special songs for her. Sitting at the piano, he sings "I'll Dream of You Again", from this album.

Certifications

External links
"We Are in Love" music video, at singingfool.com

1990 albums
Harry Connick Jr. albums
Columbia Records albums
Grammy Award for Best Jazz Vocal Performance, Male